In 1917, the voters of Texas, recognizing the necessity of developing and conserving the State's water resources and inspired by devastating floods of 1913 and 1914, passed a Constitutional amendment allowing the Legislature to create special purpose political subdivisions of the State to serve regional areas, generally coincidental with river basins and to be generally known as river authorities.

The San Antonio River Authority (SARA), created in 1937, is one of many such active river authorities in the State of Texas. Its jurisdiction covers 3,658 square miles—all of Bexar, Wilson, Karnes and Goliad Counties.

A 12-member Board of Directors governs SARA. Six directors are elected from Bexar County and two are elected from each of the three other counties with each elected member serving six years. Policies established by the Board are executed by the management organization under the direction of a General Manager appointed by the Board. SARA has the statutory authority to impose an ad valorem tax for use in planning, operations and maintenance activities only. Its tax is statutorily limited to two cents per $100 of assessed property valuation. The FY 2015-2016 ad valorem tax rate is set at $0.01729 per $100 assessed valuation and the amended 2017-2018 budget is $241.7 million.

Dams and reservoirs 
SARA operates 13 dams in Karnes County and all 26 dams in Bexar County.

SARA also provides project assistance in maintaining and improving the famed San Antonio River Walk.

External links 
 
 The University of Texas at San Antonio houses a collection of records consisting of reports, project materials, correspondence, maps, surveys, minutes and photographs. Also included are newspaper clippings, publications including SARA newsletters, magazines, and brochures. Historical research materials in the collection include photographs and documentation of the flood of 1921 as well as photographs of activity of the San Antonio River during the early part of the 20th century.

Companies based in San Antonio
Government agencies established in 1937
River authorities of Texas
State agencies of Texas
Water companies of the United States